R (Vodafone Ltd) v Secretary of State for Business, Enterprise and Regulatory Reform (2010) C-58/08 is an EU law case relevant for UK enterprise law, concerning telecommunications.

Facts
Vodafone Ltd (along with Telefónica O2 Europe plc, T-Mobile International AG and Orange Personal Communications Services Ltd, Hutchison 3G UK Ltd and the GSM Association) claimed that the Roaming Regulation 717/2007 lacked any legal basis under TEC art 95 (now TFEU art 114). This capped charges that mobile operators could make for roaming services on public mobile networks for voice calls between member states. They also argued it was disproportionate and offended the principle of subsidiarity, imposing a ceiling for wholesale charges per minute and for retail charges, plus an obligation to inform roaming customers about the charges.

AG Maduro gave an opinion that there was no lack of proportionality in price regulation.

Judgment
The CJEU Grand Chamber rejected that the Regulation had no basis. TEC art 95 measures had to be adopted to genuinely improve the establishment and functioning of the internal market: R (British American Tobacco Investments Ltd) v Secretary of State for Health (2002) C-491/01. The Regulation ensured a coherent framework based on objective criteria for smooth market functioning, a high level of consumer protection and competition among networks. National measures were adopted that led to divergence in rules. It was legitimate.

See also

United Kingdom enterprise law
EU law

Notes

References

United Kingdom enterprise case law